Marina Catena is an Italian humanitarian. She is the director of the United Nations World Food Programme (Paris), Lieutenant of the Italian Army (Specialized Reserve) and writer.

Career
She obtained the International Baccalaureate at the United World College of the Adriatic, and attended the Libera Università Internazionale degli Studi Sociali Guido Carli (LUISS) in Rome, where she graduated in Political Sciences (International Relations) and the Institut D'Etudes Politiques (Strasbourg). She worked as a flight attendant for Air France.

 
Since 1999, she is an official of the United Nations World Food Programme. She is the director of the United Nations World Food Program for France and Monaco, Paris. In 2015, she conceived, managed and launched the global awareness campaign "805 million names" with football star Zlatan Ibrahimović and ad agency Forsman & Bodenfors. 

She was Special Advisor to Minister Bernard Kouchner, Special Representative of the Secretary General to Peace keeping operation in Kosovo UNMIK (1999-2001). She served as Special Advisor to Operation Iraqi Freedom in Iraq (2003). She served as United Nations Blue Helmet in UNIFIL Peace keeping Operation in Lebanon with Paratroopers Brigade "Folgore" (2007) and with Bersaglieri Brigade "Garibaldi" (2019). She served in Operazione Strade Sicure Esercito Italiano with Granatieri di Sardegna.

She was awarded Chevalier Ordre national du Mérite by President Nicolas Sarkozy (2009) and Cavaliere Ordine al Merito della Repubblica Italiana (2018).

Writings
Romanzo Militare: #Operazione Double Sierra (RUBBETTINO - 2018): a reality novel about the Strade Sicure anti-terrorism operation in the streets of Rome (2018).
A woman soldier: diary of an Italian lieutenant in Lebanon (RIZZOLI - 2008). First book written in Italy by a woman-soldier on everyday life of soldiers in the front line.
 The train of Kosovo Polje (SELLERIO - 2003) for which she received the Award for Fiction The Country of Women.
 Essays on civil-military relations among them: "The role of female soldiers in peacekeeping missions" (Italian Air Force Magazine), "Women and the Labyrinth of Leadership" (Il Sole 24 ore - Harvard Business Review).

References

External links
https://www.granatieridisardegnapresidenza.it/2018/12/22/10257/
http://www.luiss.it/news/2019/01/09/marina-catena-diplomazia-onu-e-mimetica-una-vita-senza-frontiere
TEDx talk: "The Magic of Names"
 "805 million names" campaign with football player Zlatan Ibrahimovic
 Huffington Post OP-ED: "805 Million Names" and how it all started
 Visite de la Directrice du PAM Mme Marina Catena à Monaco - News Monte-Carlo 
 Interview: ERASMUS Alumni 

Italian soldiers
Italian officials of the United Nations
Living people
Year of birth missing (living people)
Knights of the Ordre national du Mérite
People educated at a United World College